Peter N. Wasylyk (born 1957) is an American attorney who is also a Democratic party member of the Rhode Island House of Representatives, representing the 6th District since 2003. During the 2009-2010 sessions, he served on the House Committee on Health, Education and Welfare, and served as Deputy Majority Leader. Wasylyk was defeated in the 14 September 2010 Democratic Primary to Raymond A. Hull, who went on to win the general election on 2 November 2010.

References

External links
Rhode Island House - Representative Peter Wasylyk official RI House website

Democratic Party members of the Rhode Island House of Representatives
Rhode Island lawyers
1957 births
Living people
Politicians from Providence, Rhode Island
Place of birth missing (living people)
Lawyers from Providence, Rhode Island